Armin Kurt Seiffert (born December 21, 1935) is an American competition rower and Olympic champion.

Born in Detroit, Michigan, he competed at the 1956 Summer Olympics in Melbourne, where he received a gold medal as coxswain in coxed pairs, with Conn Findlay and Arthur Ayrault.

References

1935 births
Living people
American male rowers
Stanford Cardinal rowers
Olympic gold medalists for the United States in rowing
Rowers at the 1956 Summer Olympics
Rowers at the 1960 Summer Olympics
Medalists at the 1956 Summer Olympics
Coxswains (rowing)
Rowers from Detroit